Norwegian Energy Company ASA also known as Noreco is an independent international petroleum company based in Norway. The company was established in January 2005 by Norway's local industry leaders. In December 2005, was awarded 3 production licences. In 2007, the company acquired Altinex ASA and in 2008, Talisman Oil Denmark. Main objective of the company is to explore, develop and produce oil and gas in the North Sea. The company operates in Norway, Denmark and United Kingdom.

See also

 Oselvar oil field

References

External links
 

Oil companies of Norway
Non-renewable resource companies established in 2005
Companies listed on the Oslo Stock Exchange